The Technoavia SP-95 is a Russian aerobatic aircraft, a production version of the earlier SP-91 Slava. The design is similar to the Sukhoi Su-26 family as it was designed by the same designer. It is an aerobatic competition aircraft and can be changed from single-seat to two-seat configuration. The SP-95 is a metal construction low-wing cantilever monoplane with a conventional landing gear with a tail-wheel. It is powered by a Vedeneyev M14P radial piston engine.

Variants 
SP-91 Slava
Prototype aerobatic competition aircraft powered by an AOOT M-14P engine, five built. Also marketed outside Russia as the Interavia I-3.
SP-95
Production variant of the SP-91.

Specifications (SP-95)

See also

References

Notes

Bibliography

1990s Soviet and Russian civil utility aircraft
Low-wing aircraft
Aerobatic aircraft
SP-95
Single-engined tractor aircraft